Matthew Todd Lauer (born December 30, 1957) is an American former television news personality, best known for his work with NBC News. After serving as a local news personality in New York City on WNBC, his first national exposure was as the news anchor for The Today Show from 1994 to 1997.  In 1997, he was moved from the news desk to the host's chair, and served as the co-host of NBC's Today show from 1997 to 2017. He was also a frequent contributor for the evening news magazine Dateline NBC. With NBC, Lauer hosted the annual Macy's Thanksgiving Day Parade and co-hosted the opening ceremonies of several Olympic Games.

Following allegations of inappropriate sexual behavior, Lauer's contract was terminated by NBC in November 2017 after the network reported receiving "a detailed complaint from a colleague about inappropriate sexual behavior in the workplace" and added that the network had "reason to believe this may not have been an isolated incident".

Early life 
Lauer was born in New York City, the son of Marilyn Lauer, a boutique owner, and Jay Robert Lauer, a bicycle-company executive.

Lauer's father was of Romanian Jewish ancestry, as seen on the Today Shows Finding Our Roots. Lauer said, "My dad was Jewish. My mom is not. So I was not raised anything. I do feel a desire now to find something spiritual. Getting married and wanting to have kids has something to do with that."

Education and early career 
Lauer earned his undergraduate degree from Ohio University at age 39 in 1997; he had studied at the school's Scripps College of Communication, School of Media Arts and Studies. He had previously dropped out of the same institution in the spring of 1979 to begin his television career, after he was hired as a producer of the noon newscast for WOWK-TV in Huntington, West Virginia. By 1980, he had become an on-air reporter for the station's 6 p.m. and 11 p.m. newscasts.

He then started to move around the East Coast, hosting a number of daily information and talk programs. He was a co-host of PM Magazine in several cities, beginning in Richmond (1980–1981), then Providence (1981–1984), and then New York City (1984–1986). After the New York edition of PM Magazine was canceled by WNYW in 1986, Lauer and co-host Jill Rappaport worked on a new show for the station, Made in New York, which ran for fifteen weeks. This was followed by Lauer gaining his first national television exposure, as he joined Robin Leach in co-hosting ABC's short-lived daytime series Fame, Fortune and Romance, a spin-off of the syndicated Lifestyles of the Rich and Famous. Lauer then returned to local television, hosting programs in Philadelphia and Boston for a two-year period between 1987 and 1989, during which time he reported for ESPN and  anchored entertainment news segments for HBO.

In September 1989, Lauer returned to New York City, this time to WWOR-TV, where he hosted 9 Broadcast Plaza, a three-hour live interview program. He departed that series as it took a turn in booking "tabloid" guests and topics, and for what he relayed as a refusal to live-read ads on the show for Dial-a-Mattress. WWOR-TV replaced Lauer with Richard Bey, and 9 Broadcast Plaza eventually morphed into The Richard Bey Show.

In 1990, he was hired by the Kushner-Locke Company to host a pilot called Day in Court, executive-produced by veteran producer David Sams, who helped to launch The Oprah Winfrey Show into national syndication. The program was retitled Trial Watch when it went to series, and ran on the NBC network for two seasons. NBC hired Robb Weller as host over Lauer when the program was picked up as a daily series.

The same year, he filmed a pilot for the World Wrestling Federation's bodybuilding spinoff, the World Bodybuilding Federation for USA Network known as WBF BodyStars, though WWF owner/chairman Vince McMahon later decided to host the program himself. In 1991, Lauer appeared as the co-host (along with Willow Bay) of Etc., Etc., a show on the Travel Channel.

Career at NBC News 

Lauer joined NBC in 1992, when he became co-anchor of the early weekday news show Today in New York on the network's New York flagship station WNBC. After a year, he also filled the role of Live at Five co-anchor with Sue Simmons, eventually taking the role permanently and giving up the morning shift by 1994; he was replaced on Today in New York by Maurice DuBois. Lauer remained on Live at Five until 1996.

Lauer's on-camera presence would soon provide him many opportunities with NBC News. Lauer filled in as the newsreader on The Today Show for Margaret Larson when needed from 1992 to 1993. This "audition" period allowed him to join The Today Show full-time in January 1994 as news anchor, while still co-anchoring Today in New York and Live at Five.

Lauer stepped in for Scott Simon, Mike Schneider and Jack Ford as the co-host of Weekend Today, and for Ann Curry as anchor of the former NBC News program NBC News at Sunrise from 1992 to 1997. He had also filled in for Tom Brokaw on NBC Nightly News. As the Today Show news anchor, he also substituted for Bryant Gumbel on the Today Show before being named the official co-anchor on January 6, 1997, after Gumbel stepped down. On top of Lauer's duties on The Today Show, he also hosted programming on Discovery Channel and MSNBC.

From 1998 until 2011, Lauer embarked on what was generally an annual five-day, globe-spanning adventure called Where in the World is Matt Lauer? on the Today Show during TV sweeps. The segment was named after the PBS game show Where in the World Is Carmen Sandiego? from which it borrowed the theme song. This segment sent Lauer to various locations around the world, from where he reported on the importance of each location. He broadcast from locations including Bhutan, Easter Island, the Panama Canal, Iran, Hong Kong, Croatia, and the Great Wall of China. In 2011, NBC News postponed the segment in consideration of the stagnant, unstable U.S. economy.

On some occasions, Lauer conducted interviews that escalated into tense exchanges. During a June 2005 interview with Tom Cruise, Lauer argued with Cruise about psychiatry and postpartum depression, and Cruise called Lauer "glib." In December 2008, Cruise said he regretted the exchange.

On June 19, 2007, he interviewed Prince William and Prince Harry.

Between 1998 and 2017, he co-hosted NBC's live coverage of Macy's Thanksgiving Day Parade.

Lauer co-hosted the opening ceremonies of several Olympic Games, carrying on what his former co-host Katie Couric had done since the 2000 Summer Olympics. He co-hosted the opening ceremonies of the 2008 Summer Olympics, the 2010 Winter Olympics, the 2012 Summer Olympics, the 2014 Winter Olympics and the 2016 Summer Olympics. His commentary on the 2012 opening ceremonies, along with that of co-hosts Meredith Vieira and Bob Costas, came under fierce criticism, being described as "ignorant" and "banal".

On the April 5, 2012, program, Lauer announced that he had signed a new contract with NBC News through 2017. Forbes estimated that the contract paid Lauer $25 million a year.

It has been widely reported that Lauer had influenced co-anchor Ann Curry's departure from The Today Show, executed by its executive producer Jim Bell under the name called "Operation Bambi."

During the 2014 Winter Olympics, Lauer replaced prime-time host Bob Costas from February 11–14, after Costas suffered a major eye infection.

In November 2015, Lauer hosted an interview with Charlie Sheen, during which Sheen revealed that he was HIV-positive.

On September 8, 2016, Lauer conducted separate 30-minute interviews with presidential candidates Hillary Clinton and Donald Trump, both of which were met with much criticism. Lauer devoted much of the Clinton interview to questions about her e-mail server, and according to critics, appeared to rush through audience-led topics such as domestic terror attacks and veterans' affairs, implying that there was not enough time to cover these in detail. Many also felt that Lauer failed to challenge Trump on alleged inaccuracies, such as his statement that he was "totally against the war in Iraq," which other sources called "lies." CNN reported that the short amount of time for the interviews, the short notice with which they were conducted, and the small amount of audience questions were a major reason for the poor reviews.

On November 30, 2016, it was revealed that Lauer had signed a new contract up to 2018. Variety reported that his salary was $20 million a year. On January 6, 2017, Lauer celebrated his 20th anniversary on The Today Show with a look back at some of his most memorable moments on the show.

Sexual misconduct allegations 

On November 29, 2017, NBC News announced that Lauer's employment had been terminated after an unidentified female NBC employee reported that Lauer had sexually harassed her during the 2014 Winter Olympics in Sochi, Russia, and that the harassment continued after they returned to New York. Andrew Lack, chairman of NBC News, sent a memorandum to his staff that said, in part, "On Monday night, we received a detailed complaint from a colleague about inappropriate sexual behavior in the workplace by Matt Lauer. ... While it is the first complaint about his behavior in the over 20 years he's been at NBC News, we were also presented with reason to believe this may not have been an isolated incident." A network executive said Lauer would not receive any form of monetary settlement because he was fired "for cause". His contract had been scheduled to run through the end of 2018.

NBC News management said it had been aware that The New York Times and Variety had been conducting independent investigations of Lauer's behavior, but that management had been unaware of previous allegations against Lauer.  Later reporting disputed this; Linda Vester, a former NBC News correspondent, said that management had to have known and that "everybody knew" that Lauer was dangerous.  In the 2019 book Catch and Kill: Lies, Spies, and a Conspiracy to Protect Predators, Ronan Farrow cited multiple sources who stated that NBC News was not only aware of Lauer's misconduct beforehand, but that Harvey Weinstein used this knowledge to pressure the program into killing a story that would have outed his own sexual assaults. Variety reported allegations by at least ten of Lauer's current and former colleagues. Additional accusations went public in the ensuing days. NBC acknowledged three additional cases from 2000 to 2007.

In Catch and Kill, Farrow reveals one of the alleged victims as Brooke Nevils, who says Lauer anally raped her in his hotel room while the two were in Sochi covering the 2014 Winter Olympics for NBC. Farrow also writes in his book that Nevils had additional sexual encounters with Lauer after the initial incident, but she characterized those encounters as "transactional", and consented only out of fear that Lauer had control over her career.

In a statement made after his firing, Lauer apologized for his actions, saying, "Some of what is being said about me is untrue or mischaracterized, but there is enough truth in these stories to make me feel embarrassed and ashamed." Following Nevils' allegation of sexual assault that was published in Farrow's book, Lauer issued an open letter confirming that he had a consensual sexual relationship with Nevils and that the relationship started in 2014 in Sochi, but denying that the initial encounter was non-consensual.

Two weeks after Lauer's firing, Addie Zinone, a former Today production assistant, made an additional accusation, saying that she had a consensual sexual relationship with Lauer in June 2000. Zinone claimed that the relationship was an "abuse of power" on Lauer's part because Zinone said that she felt that turning down Lauer's advances would have hurt her career.<ref>{{cite news|url=https://www.nbcnews.com/storyline/sexual-misconduct/addie-zinone-matt-lauer-relationship-was-abuse-power-n830721|title=Addie Zinone: Matt Lauer relationship was 'an abuse of power|date=December 18, 2017|website=NBC News|first1=Elizabeth |last1=Chuck|first2=Dartunorro|last2=Clark}}</ref>

According to Farrow,  Today show booker Melissa Lonner claims that Lauer exposed himself to her in 2010 at an NBC cocktail party. He denies this claim and through his lawyer said, "he will not take part in the marketing circus of this book."

In 2008, Lauer was the subject of a roast by the New York Friars Club where several of his colleagues made jokes about his reputation for having relationships with his staff.

 Other work 
Lauer made a guest appearance as himself on a live episode of Will & Grace in early 2006.

In November 2006, Lauer and his daughter Romy hosted the Sesame Street direct-to-DVD show Sesame Beginnings: Exploring Together. Lauer hosted The Greatest American on the Discovery Channel, which used internet and telephone voting by viewers to select the winner. Lauer was critical of his own program, since it tended to favor well-known figures over others who had less influence in pop culture.

He served as the 2009 Class Day speaker at Harvard University's undergraduate commencement ceremonies on June 3, 2009.

Lauer has appeared as himself in the 2009 film Land of the Lost, the 2011 film The Beaver and voiced reporter Hark Hanson in the direct–to–DVD animated sequel Curious George 2: Follow That Monkey!. He also made appearances in the 2011 films Drew Peterson: Untouchable and Tower Heist; archival footage of Lauer is shown in the 2015 film Straight Outta Compton and the 2017 films Lady Bird and I, Tonya. He also appeared as himself in the TV movies Sharknado 2: The Second One and Sharknado 3: Oh Hell No!.

 Career timeline 
 1979–1980: News producer and reporter, WOWK-TV, Huntington, West Virginia
 1980–1981: Co-host, PM Magazine, WXEX-TV, Richmond, Virginia
 1981–1984: Co-host, PM Magazine, WJAR-TV, Providence, Rhode Island
 1984–1986: Co-host, PM Magazine, WNEW-TV, New York City
 1986: Co-host, Made in New York, WNYW, New York City
 1986–1987: Co-host, Fame, Fortune and Romance, ABC
 1987–1988: Host, Live on City Line, WCAU-TV, Philadelphia
 1988–1989: Host, Talk of the Town, WNEV-TV, Boston
 1989–1991: Co-host, 9 Broadcast Plaza, WWOR-TV, Secaucus, New Jersey
 1992–1996: Various positions at WNBC-TV, New York City
 September 1992 – September 1994: Today in New York co-anchor
 August 1993 – September 1996: early evening newscast Live at Five co-anchor
 1992–2017: Various positions at NBC News, New York City
 1992–1997: fill-in anchor on Weekend Today and NBC News at Sunrise 1993–1994: Today fill-in news anchor
 June 13, 1994 – January 3, 1997: Today  news anchor
 January 6, 1997 – November 28, 2017: Today co-anchor
 1997–2017: Dateline NBC contributing anchor
 1998–2016: Christmas in Rockefeller Center host
 1998–2017: Macy's Thanksgiving Day Parade host
 2010–2013: Rock Center with Brian Williams'' correspondent

Personal life 

Lauer is a grandson of singer Art Gentry. Lauer was married to television producer Nancy Alspaugh from 1982 to 1989. They had no children. He later married Dutch model Annette Roque, whom he met on a blind date in July 1997. Lauer proposed to Roque after five months of dating, and the two wed in Bridgehampton, New York on October 3, 1998. They have three children together: son Jack (b. June 26, 2001), daughter Romy (b. October 2, 2003), and son Thijs (b. November 28, 2006). 

In 2006, while pregnant with her son Thijs, Roque filed for divorce due to "mental abuse, extreme mental and emotional distress, humiliation, torment, and anxiety" by Lauer. Weeks later, they reconciled. On September 7, 2019, Lauer and Roque officially divorced, following nearly two years of separation in the wake of his 2017 sexual harassment allegations.

References

External links 

 Bio on the Today Show (Archived on January 17, 2017)
 
 

1957 births
20th-century American journalists
American male journalists
21st-century American journalists
American people of Romanian-Jewish descent
Daytime Emmy Award winners
News & Documentary Emmy Award winners
Living people
NBC News people
New York (state) television reporters
Ohio University alumni
People from Greenwich, Connecticut
Television anchors from Boston
Television anchors from New York City
Television anchors from Philadelphia